Acraea boopis, the rainforest acraea, is a butterfly of the family Nymphalidae. It is found in KwaZulu-Natal, Eswatini, from Mozambique to Kenya and in Tanzania.

The wingspan is 45–52 mm for males and 49–58 mm for females. Adults are on wing year round, with peaks from November to March in southern Africa.

The larvae feed on Celastraceae species, including Cassine tetragonal, Maytenus acuminate, Maytenus heterophylla and Rawsonia lucida.

Subspecies
Acraea boopis boopis (South Africa in Afromontane and higher lowland forest in Eastern Cape, then along the escarpment through KwaZulu-Natal, also in Mpumalanga and Limpopo)
Acraea boopis ama Pierre, 1979 (Kenya, northern Tanzania)
Acraea boopis choloui Pierre, 1979 (Malawi) May be a full species.

Taxonomy
It is a member of the Acraea  terpsicore  species group   -   but see also Pierre & Bernaud, 2014

References

External links

Images representing Acraea boopis ama at Bold
Images representing Acraea choloui at Bold
Acraea boopis fiche Dominique Bernaud
Acraea boopis site Dominique Bernaud

Butterflies described in 1914
boopis